The Güzelyalı railway station is a railway station in Pendik, Istanbul, on the Marmaray line. It was a stop on the Haydarpaşa suburban commuter rail line until 2012. The original station had two side platforms with two tracks.

The station was closed on 1 February 2012, when all train traffic between Pendik and Arifiye was temporarily suspended due to construction of the Ankara-Istanbul high-speed railway. It was demolished shortly thereafter and a new station built in its place, consisting of an island platform serving two tracks, with a third express track on the south side.

Güzelyalı Station opened in 12 March 2019 along with the entire Marmaray line.

References

External links
TCDD Taşımacılık
Marmaray

Railway stations in Istanbul Province
Pendik
Marmaray